D'wayne Patrice Wiggins (born February 14, 1961) is an American singer, guitarist, and record producer best known as the founding member of the 1990s soul/R&B group Tony! Toni! Toné!

Early life 
Wiggins was born in Oakland, California; specifically in the Lower Bottoms neighborhood of West Oakland. He was raised in East Oakland, where he attended Castlemont High School.

Early career and Tony! Toni! Toné! 
Wiggins is the founding member of Tony! Toni! Toné! The group has 14 Billboard-charting R&B singles, including five number one hits, three Top Ten pop singles, one gold album, two platinum albums and one double platinum album. They sold over six million albums during their career together. In 2006, Tony! Toni! Toné! was included in the New Jack Reunion Tour line-up. The group has toured internationally since 1998 and continues to perform on tours today.

Music 
Wiggins established Grass Roots Entertainment located in his West Oakland recording studio, “House of Music”. Also in 1995, D’wayne Wiggins developed and signed Destiny's Child to Grass Roots Entertainment. The group went on to become a powerhouse of female performers and the best-selling girl group of all time. He worked with the group through three albums, which have collectively sold more than 15 million copies. He also worked with artist Keyshia Cole, who resided in the “House of Music” from 1999 to 2001. Cole was mentored and received guidance from Wiggins during that time and went on to sign with A&M Records. He also worked with Laurneá of Arrested Development on her release Laurnea II and collaborated with Jody Watley. His “House of Music” was patronized by artists such as Alicia Keys, Beyoncé, India.Arie, Keyshia Cole, Jamie Foxx, Eddie Money and producer Scott Storch.

Wiggins released first solo project with Motown Records, Eyes Never Lie, in 2000 featuring collaborations with Darius Rucker of Hootie and the Blowfish, Jamie Foxx and Carlos Santana. This album contributed to the foundation of the neo soul genre.

Wiggins also worked with the pioneers of what is known as Oakland's “Hyphy” movement on such projects as: Too Short’s How Does It Feel and Hoochie; Messy Marv’s Blades; and The Coup’s Pick A Bigger Weapon album released in 2006. You can find his guitar skills and vocals on Ludacris’s Splash Waterfalls Remix. He also formed the group Kenya Gruv, performing Top Of The World on the Menace II Society movie soundtrack.

In 2003, Wiggins went into the studio to work with platinum artist Alicia Keys. The title track single, Diary, made Top Ten on the Billboard charts as well as the album going platinum and winning four Grammy Awards in 2005. D'wayne Wiggins co-produced another track on the album and performed the sitar, If I Was Your Woman, winning him a Grammy for production.

Film and TV 
In 2001, Wiggins was executive producer of the independent movie Me & Mrs. Jones and Life Is, a documentary on the life of multi-platinum music rapper Too Short. He also had an acting part in the movie Get Money in 2003.

In 2005, Wiggins was on TV arena as bandleader for the television show Weekends at the D.L., hosted by comedian D. L. Hughley, which aired on the Comedy Central cable network.

Current projects 
Wiggins continues to tour as bandleader of Tony! Toni! Toné!

References

External links

Poplyfe website
Tony Toni Tone
Electric Church

1963 births
Tony! Toni! Toné!
American rhythm and blues musicians
Living people
Musicians from Oakland, California
American people of Nigerian descent